Elena Artamendi Garcia (born 7 August 1939) is a Spanish gymnast. She competed in six events at the 1960 Summer Olympics.

See also
List of Olympic female artistic gymnasts for Spain

References

External links
 

1939 births
Living people
Spanish female artistic gymnasts
Olympic gymnasts of Spain
Gymnasts at the 1960 Summer Olympics
Gymnasts from Barcelona
20th-century Spanish women